Maanagara Kaaval is a 1991 Indian Tamil-language action-thriller film directed by M. Thiyagarajan. The film stars Vijayakanth and Suma. It is the 150th film of AVM Productions. The film was released on 28 June 1991.

Plot 
Ashok Metha, a senior politician, is enraged when a junior Roopavathi is made the Prime Minister of India. Though he pretends to accept his party's decision, he secretly plots to eliminate her. Meanwhile, a high-profile officer is killed in Delhi by a professional killer, Robin and Vidya witnesses the murder.

Vidya arrives in Chennai for a dance event and falls in love with Subash, an honest IPS officer who is mourning the loss of his beloved sister. He manages to impress Roopavathi by arresting Vannai Varathan, an MP from her party, for creating social unrest. She gives him a green signal, and Varathan is arrested. Varathan swears revenge. As the story progresses, Subash begins to develop feelings for Vidya.

Robin, who arrives in Chennai, tries to murder Vidya. But Subash catches him, and under the orders of his superior, IG Jayaprakash, he accompanies Robin to Delhi so as to hand him over to the Delhi police. Vidya also joins them.  Robin manages to escape with the help of his gang, who pretend to be the concerned police officers, and Subash is suspended. However, Subash swears to find the culprits and stays in Vidya's house in Delhi. He is confronted by Gowtham IPS who was supposed to have taken Robin from the airport and accuses him of aiding an anarchist. Subash, on the contrary, believes Gowtham to be a mole.

After spotting and chasing Robin, Subash, much to his horror, comes across his dead sister Seetha. She reveals the circumstances that forced her to land there and also says that Gowtham is her husband. Parallel to these incidents, it is shown that Robin was hired by Metha to assassinate Roopavathi. The person whom the latter murdered in the beginning of the movie was Roopavathi, Chief Security Officer. Metha is indirectly helped by Vannai Varathan, who is out of the prison.

Subash discovers that the Inspector General of the Delhi police is the actual mole. However, before he can extract more information, the IG is killed. With the help of Gowtham, Subash manages to inform Roopavathi about Metha's treachery. Still, she is unable to take action against him due to his support and clean image in the party. Robin and his associates kidnaps and imprisons  Gowtham, Subash and Seetha. After a prolonged struggle, Subash frees himself and kills Robin and Metha while an attempt was made on the life of Roopavathi.

Cast 
 Vijayakanth as ACP Subhash IPS
 Suman Ranganathan as Vidhya
 M. N. Nambiar IG Jayaprakash
 Lakshmi as PM Roopavathi
 Nassar as Gowtham IPS
 Vaishnavi as Seetha
 Anandaraj as Robin
 P. J. Sarma as Ashok Metha
 Dubbing Janaki as Subhash & Seetha Mother
 Senthil as Alagappan
 Thiyagu as MP Vannai Varathan
 Chinni Jayanth  as Seenu
 LIC Narasimhan as Sivasankar
 Ganga as Suresh
 Baby Vichitra as seetha's daughter
 Ponnambalam as Fighter
 Thalapathy Dinesh as Fighter
Murali Kumar as Police Inspector

Production 
Maanagara Kaaval was partially filmed at Palam airport, New Delhi. It was the 150th film produced by AVM. The film became Thyagarajan's final film as director before his death in 2021.

Soundtrack 
The music was composed by Chandrabose, with lyrics by Vaali.

Reception 
N. Krishnaswamy of The Indian Express wrote, "Even a film that sheet anchors itself on thrilling action, [..] in credibility by neat characterisation [..] but Maanagara Kaaval doesnt waste time on these." C.R.K. of Kalki appreciated the film primarily for the cast performances.

References

Bibliography

External links 
 

1990s political thriller films
1990s Tamil-language films
1991 action thriller films
1991 films
AVM Productions films
Cultural depictions of prime ministers of India
Films scored by Chandrabose (composer)
Indian action thriller films
Indian political thriller films